Pedicularis semibarbata, known by the common name pinewoods lousewort, is a species of flowering plant in the family Orobanchaceae.

It is native to California and Nevada. It can often be found in coniferous forests of the Peninsular Ranges, Sierra Nevada, and Transverse Ranges.

Description
Pedicularis semibarbata is a perennial herb producing several stems up to 20 centimeters long from a caudex, but most of the stem is beneath the soil and the plant is low on the ground. The leaves are up to 20 centimeters long, lance-shaped shape and divided into many toothed or lobed segments.

The inflorescence is a raceme of flowers with hairy bracts and sepals surrounding the flower bases. Each hairy red- or purple-tinged yellow flower is club-shaped and may exceed 2 centimeters in length. Toward the middle it is divided into a broad hooded upper lip and a three-lobed lower lip.

Parasitic plant
Like many species in the broomrape family, the lousewort is a root-parasite. This species taps nutrients from conifers and the lupine Lupinus fulcratus.

Some authors recognize the Pedicularis semibarbata subtaxon charlestonensis, which is endemic to Nevada.

References

External links

Jepson Manual Treatment: Pedicularis semibarbata
USDA Plants Profile — Pedicularis semibarbata
Pedicularis semibarbata — UC Photo gallery

semibarbata
Parasitic plants
Flora of California
Flora of Nevada
Flora of the Cascade Range
Flora of the Sierra Nevada (United States)
Natural history of the California Coast Ranges
Natural history of the Peninsular Ranges
Natural history of the Transverse Ranges
Taxa named by Asa Gray
Flora without expected TNC conservation status